Pentti Nöyränen (born May 20, 1983) is a Finnish ice hockey player who currently plays professionally in Finland for Espoo Blues of the SM-liiga.

References

External links

1983 births
Finnish ice hockey right wingers
Living people
Espoo Blues players
Sportspeople from Espoo